Out of the Silent North is a 1922 American silent drama film directed by William Worthington and written by Wallace C. Clifton and George C. Hull. The film stars Frank Mayo, Barbara Bedford, Frank Leigh, Harris Gordon, Christian J. Frank, and Frank Lanning. The film was released on June 19, 1922, by Universal Film Manufacturing Company.

Plot
As described in a film magazine, French Canadian trapper Pierre Baptiste (Mayo) is in love with  Marcette Vallois (Bedford), daughter of the post storekeeper, but he does not declare his love until he sets out with Englishman Reginald Stannard (Gordon) to locate a mine. A map giving the location of the mine falls into the hands of a loafer at the post, and unscrupulous schemers who have recently arrived at the post take advantage of the absence of Reginald to arrest Pierre to get possession of the mine. Pierre discovers that he and Stafford have located the mine on the wrong creek, so he rushes to town to relocate the claim and wins in a hard race with the schemers. In the end, Marcette declares her love for him.

Cast          
Frank Mayo as Pierre Baptiste
Barbara Bedford as Marcette Vallois
Frank Leigh as Ashleigh Nefferton
Harris Gordon as Reginald Stannard
Christian J. Frank as Pete Bellew
Frank Lanning as Jean Cour
Louis Rivera as Mattigami
Dick La Reno as 'Lazy' Lester

References

External links

1922 films
1920s English-language films
Silent American drama films
1922 drama films
Universal Pictures films
Films directed by William Worthington
American silent feature films
American black-and-white films
1920s American films